Calendula arvensis is a species of flowering plant in the daisy family known by the common name field marigold. It is native to central and southern Europe, and it is known across the globe as an introduced species.

The leaves are lance-shaped and borne on petioles from the slender, hairy stem. The inflorescence is a single flower head up to four centimeters wide with bright yellow to yellow-orange ray florets around a center of yellow disc florets. The fruit is an achene which can take any of three shapes, including ring-shaped, that facilitate different methods of dispersal.

Achene

Calendula arvensis produce three types of achenes (fruits of the sunflower family), they are rostrate, cymbiform and annular. Rostrate and cymbiform are suitable for long-distance diffusion, because they have larger size and weight than annular, while annular is suitable for short-distance diffusion.

References

External links
Jepson Manual Treatment

arvensis
Flora of Europe
Plants described in 1763
Taxa named by Carl Linnaeus